The Undisputed World B-Boy Series is a b-boy or breaking championship series established in 2013 that connects the renowned solo international b-boy competitions worldwide.

The Undisputed Masters. After the series has been concluded, mostly at the end the year, the champions of each competition meet in a masters event called "Undisputed Masters" and compete to establish who is the "Undisputed" champion.

The Undisputed Ranking is a ranking accumulating the top 16 results of each championship in the World B-Boy Series. The overall ranking leader if not a champion, is also invited to the Undisputed Masters. The ranking is also used to reward wildcards for competitors to compete in the Undisputed Masters.

History
In 2007 Johnjay Chon and Charlie Shin creators of R-16 Korea took the initiative to organise annual conferences inviting stakeholders of the Breaking community. At these conferences top competitors, judges and promoters discussed topics such as the future of competition Breaking. In 2012 at the Red Bull BC One World Final in Rio de Janeiro the concept to unify the major world Breaking championships through an events series was initiated. In 2013 after a two-day conference in Berlin a group of promoters, high level competitors and competition judges created the Undisputed World B-Boy Series and the Undisputed Masters. The first Undisputed World B-Boy Series kicked off in March 2014 at Battle Pro in Paris. The events in the first Undisputed World B-Boy series were; R-16 Korea, Battle of the Year, Red Bull BC One, The Notorious IBE, UK B-Boy Championships, Freestyle Session and Outbreak Europe. The first Undisputed Masters took place on December 14, 2014, in London.

Events in Undisputed World B-Boy Series

Undisputed Masters winners 2014-2020

Past World B-Boy Series events

Ranking & Winners
The championships on the Undisputed World B-Boy Series use a ranking system to rank its top 16 participants.
Competitors are not limited to the number of events he or she can participate in.

Points for ranking

Ranking winners

World BBoy Series 2019 / Undisputed Masters VI

To qualify for the Undisputed Masters VI, Breakers had to win 1 of 10 World B-Boy Series championships or win the Undisputed Ranking. Additional wildcards were rewarded to competitors based on their position on the Undisputed Ranking.

The Undisputed Masters VI was held in Malmö, Sweden on December 14, 2019.

Victor  was unable to attend. 2 Wildcards were rewarded to: Nord Diamond  and Tawfiq .

Judges:
Roxrite
Narumi
Lilou
Jam One
Hong 10

Host & DJ:
MC Mario Bee
DJ Bles One

Group phase

Knockout stage
Individuals in bold won their respective battles.

World BBoy Series 2018 / Undisputed Masters V

To qualify for the Undisputed Masters, Breakers had to win 1 of the 9 World B-Boy Series championships. Additional wildcards were rewarded to competitors based on their position on the Undisputed Ranking.

The Undisputed Masters V was held in Marrakech, Morocco on January 19, 2019.

Stripes  – winner of Unbreakable was unable to compete due to injury. He was replaced by Nord Diamond .

Victor  – winner Unbreakable Silverback Open Championship was unable to attend. He was replaced by Cri6 , winner of the local Moroccan Undisputed wild card battle.

Judges:
Lagaet
Freeze
Mounir
Lil Zoo
Movie1

Host & DJ:
Mario Bee
Renegade

Group phase

Group 1

Group 2

Group 3

Group winners Phil Wizard, Cheerito, Kuzya and best runner-up Issei qualified for Knock Out stage.

Knockout stage
Individuals in bold won their respective battles.

World BBoy Series 2017 / Undisputed Masters IV

To qualify for the Undisputed Masters, Breakers had to win 1 of the 9 World B-Boy Series championships. Additional wildcards were rewarded to Breakers based on their position on the Undisputed Ranking.

The Undisputed Masters IV was held in San Diego, California on January 27 and 28 of 2018.

Sunni  – winner of UK Champs was unable to obtain a US Visa. He was replaced by Spin .

Kill – winner Unbreakable was unable to attend due to military service in Korea. He was replaced by Dr. Hill .

Judges:
Storm
Flo Master
Roxrite
Moy
Bojin

Host & DJ:
Ivan the urban actionfigure
Lean Rock

Group phase

Group A

Group B

Group C

Group winners Thesis, Victor, Issei and best runner-up Vero qualified for Knock Out stage.

Knockout stage
Individuals in bold won their respective battles.

World BBoy Series 2016 / Undisputed Masters III
To qualify for the Undisputed Masters, Breakers had to win 1 of the 10 World B-Boy Series championships. Additional wildcards were rewarded to Breakers based on their position on the Undisputed Ranking.

The 2016 Undisputed Masters III event was held in Prague, Czech Republic.

Sunni was unable to compete due to injury days before the event, he was replaced by Kid Colombia on the day of the Undisputed Masters III.
Taisuke was unable to compete he was replaced by Kleju.

Judges:
Moy
Storm
Renegade
Freeze
Mounir

Host & DJ:
MC Mario Bee
MC Pablo
DJ Lean Rock

Group phase

Knockout stage
Individuals in bold won their respective battles.

World BBoy Series 2015 / Undisputed Masters II

To qualify for the Undisputed Masters, Breakers had to win 1 of the 8 World B-Boy Series championships or win the Undisputed Ranking. Additional wildcards were rewarded to competitors based on their position on the Undisputed Ranking.

The Undisputed Masters II took place in Marseilles, France on Saturday, December 12, 2015.

WildcardsIssei the Undisputed Ranking winner was unavailable to compete. El Niño winner of Outbreak Europe and Kareem invited through a wildcard both got injured prior to the competition. Sunni, the Notorious IBE winner, was also ruled out due to an injury one day before the event. 
Wilcards based on ranking positions were rewarded to; Kid Colombia(), Thomasz(), Fleau(), Alkolil(), Kleju(),

Judges:
 Cros 1
 Lilou
 Kareem
 Storm
 Focus

Host & DJ:
 MC Mario Bee
 DJ Renegade

Group phase

Group A

Group B

Knockout stage
Individuals in bold won their respective battles.

World BBoy Series 2014 / Undisputed Masters I

To qualify for the Undisputed Masters, Breakers had to win 1 of the 9 World B-Boy Series championships or win the Undisputed Ranking. Additional wildcards were rewarded to competitors based on their position on the Undisputed Ranking.

The 2014 Undisputed Masters I was held in London, England on Sunday, December 14, 2014.

Tonio winner of The Notorious IBE had to withdraw due to visa complications, he was replaced by Spin.

Judges:
 Storm
 Niek
 Renegade
 Lamine
 Roxrite

Host & DJ:
 MC Mario Bee
 DJ Lean Rock

Group phase

Group A

Group B

Knockout stage
Individuals in bold won their respective battles.

Partnerships & Brand Involvements
Dance Federations:
 UDEF, Urban Dance & Educational Foundation, Philadelphia, USA.
 CTDSF Chinese Taipei Dance Sport Federation
 WDSF, World Dance Sport Federation
 Belgian Dance Sport Federation
 USA Dance

Cities and cultural funding organisations:
 Sweden, City of Malmö
 Czech Republic: US Embassy, Visegrand Fond 
 Taipei: New Taipei City, 
 The Netherlands: City of Heerlen, Province of Limburg, Fonds voor Cultuurparticipatie, Fonds Podiumkunsten
 Belgium: City of Antwerp, Danssport Vlaanderen, Topsport Vlaanderen
 Slovakia: City and region of Banska Bystrica
 Morocco: French Institute Marrakech, Royal Federation of Sports, Aerobic, Fitness and Dance Morocco
 Germany: Goethe Institut, French Institute, US Embassy, British Council, Stiftung Braunschweiger Kulturbesitz, Lotto Sportstiftung, Kulturstiftung des Bundes
 Korea: Korea Tourism Board
 United States: Pennsylvania Department of Community & Economic Development, Silverback Educational Foundation for the Arts, Dance & Athletics, The Mural Arts of Philadelphia, Multicultural Community Family Services

Brand involvement:
 Red Bull, Monster Energy, Relentless, Puma, Jack & Jones, JBL, New Era, Jaegermeister, G-Shock, Snipes, Sony Ericcson, New Yorker, Korea Tourism Organisation, Bank SinoPac, Rabobank

Media Partners:
 New Dance Media Amsterdam, Stance TV Los Angeles, The Legits Studios Slovakia, Red Bull Media House, BBoy Network USA

References

External links
 Undisputed World Bboy Series Official site
 Pro Breaking Tour
 R-16 Official site
 UK B-Boy Championships Official site
 BOTY Official site
 Bboy Rankingz
 Legits Blast
 Red Bull BC One
 The Notorious IBE

Breakdance
Street dance competitions